The 2019 Peru Cup season, the largest amateur tournament of Peruvian football, started in February.

This edition has featured a change, with the elimination of the Regional Stage and the inclusion of participants from all the Regions of Peru in the National Stage. Under the new format, the tournament has four stages. The first three stages are played as mini-league round-robin tournaments, and the fourth stage is played under POT System intellectual property of the MatchVision company.

The 2019 Peru Cup started with the District Stage in February.  The next stage was the Provincial Stage which started in June. The tournament continued with the Departmental Stage in July. The National Stage starts in September. The winner of the National Stage will be promoted to the Liga 1 and the runner-up will be promoted to the Liga 2.

Departmental stage
Departmental Stage: 2019 Ligas Departamentales del Peru and 2019 Ligas Superiores del Perú

The following list shows the teams that qualified for the National Stage.

National Stage

League table

Round 1

|-

|-
|}

Round 2

|-

|-
|}

Round 3

|-

|-
|}

Round 4

|-

|-
|}

Round 5

|-

|-
|}

Round 6

|-

|-
|}

Final Rounds

Final group stage
The final group stage, colloquially known as La Finalísima, will be played by the four semifinalists at the Estadio Miguel Grau. The team with the most points will be declared the winner and be promoted to the  2020 Liga 1.

Round 1

Round 2

Round 3

Promotion play-off

See also
 2019 Liga 1
 2019 Liga 2
 2019 Peruvian promotion play-offs

References

External links
 Official Website
  Dechalaca Copa Peru
  Semanario Pasión

2019
Peru
2019 in Peruvian football